This article is about the particular significance of the year 1909 to Wales and its people.

Incumbents

Archdruid of the National Eisteddfod of Wales – Dyfed

Lord Lieutenant of Anglesey – Sir Richard Henry Williams-Bulkeley, 12th Baronet  
Lord Lieutenant of Brecknockshire – Joseph Bailey, 2nd Baron Glanusk
Lord Lieutenant of Caernarvonshire – John Ernest Greaves
Lord Lieutenant of Cardiganshire – Herbert Davies-Evans
Lord Lieutenant of Carmarthenshire – Sir James Williams-Drummond, 4th Baronet
Lord Lieutenant of Denbighshire – William Cornwallis-West    
Lord Lieutenant of Flintshire – Hugh Robert Hughes 
Lord Lieutenant of Glamorgan – Robert Windsor-Clive, 1st Earl of Plymouth
Lord Lieutenant of Merionethshire – W. R. M. Wynne (until 25 February); Sir Osmond Williams, 1st Baronet (from 22 March)
Lord Lieutenant of Monmouthshire – Godfrey Morgan, 1st Viscount Tredegar
Lord Lieutenant of Montgomeryshire – Sir Herbert Williams-Wynn, 7th Baronet 
Lord Lieutenant of Pembrokeshire – Frederick Campbell, 3rd Earl Cawdor
Lord Lieutenant of Radnorshire – Powlett Milbank

Bishop of Bangor – Watkin Williams 
Bishop of Llandaff – Joshua Pritchard Hughes
Bishop of St Asaph – A. G. Edwards (later Archbishop of Wales) 
Bishop of St Davids – John Owen

Events

January – Noah Ablett is a founding member of the Plebs' League at Ruskin College, Oxford.
1 January – John Ballinger becomes first librarian of the National Library of Wales which is being set up in Aberystwyth, initially in temporary premises in the former Assembly Rooms.
16 January – Edgeworth David is a member of the expedition which successfully reaches the Magnetic South Pole.
2 July – Thirty-six men are killed when a trench collapses during construction of the Alexandra Dock part of Newport Docks.
26 July–7 August - The National Pageant of Wales is held at Cardiff Castle.
30 August –  calls at Fishguard.
29 October – A mining accident at Darren Colliery, New Tredegar, kills 26 men.
December – Thomas "Toya" Lewis is awarded the Albert Medal by Edward VII for his heroism in rescuing survivors of the Newport Dock collapse on 2 July.
date unknown
King's Dock, part of Swansea Docks, is opened.
First coal raised from Penallta Colliery.
The first mines rescue station in south Wales is opened at Aberaman.
The Bryn Eglwys slate quarry, the Abergynolwyn estate and village and Talyllyn Railway are purchased by Henry Haydn Jones.
Thomas Rees becomes principal of Bala-Bangor Theological College.
Completion of Berw Bridge over the River Taff above Pontypridd, the longest reinforced concrete span in the U.K. at this date; it is designed by L. G. Mouchel to Hennebique patents and built by Watkin Williams and Page.
Clark's Pies originates in Cardiff.

Arts and literature

Awards
National Eisteddfod of Wales – held in London
Chair – T. Gwynn Jones, "Gwlad y Bryniau"
Crown – W. J. Gruffydd, "Yr Arglwydd Rhys"

New books

English language
John Gwenogvryn Evans (ed.) – Facsimile of the Chirk Codex
Edward Thomas – The South Country
Arthur Wade-Evans – Welsh Mediaeval Law

Welsh language
Emrys ap Iwan – Homilïau vol. 2 (posthumous)
Hugh Brython Hughes – Tair Cwpan Aur

Music
Evan Thomas Davies – Ynys y Plant

Sport
Boxing

23 August – Freddie Welsh wins the European lightweight title (at Mountain Ash).
8 November – Freddie Welsh wins the British lightweight title, and becomes the first boxer to be awarded a Lonsdale Belt (in London).
20 December – Thomas Thomas is awarded the first Lonsdale Belt at middleweight.
Sport of athletics
23 August – Welshman Fred 'Tenby' Davies beats Irishman Bert Day to become world champion over the half-mile distance (at Pontypridd).
Rugby league
Aberdare RLFC, Barry RLFC and Mid-Rhondda RLFC fold after just one season. The first Welsh League competition is won by Ebbw Vale.
Rugby union
Wales win their second Grand Slam.

Births

4 January – Glyndwr Michael, vagrant whose body was used as Maj. William Martin, RM, in Operation Mincemeat (died 1943)
29 January – George Thomas, 1st Viscount Tonypandy (died 1997)
14 February – Harry Peacock, Wales rugby union player (died 1996)
20 February – Bill Roberts, Wales international rugby union player (died 1969)
5 March – Howard Thomas, radio and television producer (died 1986)
10 March – Glen Moody, boxer (died 1989)
30 March – Dai Thomas, Wales national rugby player (date of death unknown)
1 April – George Ewart Evans, folklorist and oral historian (died 1988)
11 May – Aneirin Talfan Davies, writer and publisher (died 1980)
11 June – Ronnie Boon, Wales rugby union player (died 1998)
12 June – Mansel Thomas, composer and conductor (died 1986)
16 July – Eddie Jenkins footballer (died 2005)
28 July – Jack Morley, Wales and British Lions rugby player (died 1972)
25 August – Arwel Hughes, composer (died 1988)
30 September – Arthur Probert, politician (died 1975)
1 October – Jim Lang, Wales rugby union player (died 1991)
24 October – Elwyn Jones, Baron Elwyn-Jones, politician (died 1989)
25 October – Walter Vickery, Wales national rugby player (died 2000)
7 November – Eirene White, politician (died 1999)
29 November – Goronwy Rees, journalist and academic (died 1979)
14 December – Ronald Welch, historical novelist (died 1982)
date unknown 
Isaac Davies (Eic Davies), dramatist (died 1993)
Evan Roberts, botanist (died 1991)

Deaths

3 January – Robert Bird, politician, 69
8 January – Frederick Courtenay Morgan, politician, 74
9 January – Erasmus Jones, Welsh-American minister and author, 91
5 February – W. R. M. Wynne, politician, landowner, collector of manuscripts, Lord Lieutenant of Merionethshire, 68
9 March – David Thomas (Dewi Hefin), poet, 80
29 March – Catherine Prichard, poet, 66
April – Ivor James, educationist 
19 April – J. S. Pughe, Welsh-born American political cartoonist, 39
31 May – Thomas Price, Premier of South Australia, 57
9 June – Walter Rice Evans, Wales international rugby player
2 July – Sir Arthur Cowell-Stepney, landowner and politician, 74
1 August – General Sir Hugh Rowlands, VC recipient, 81
23 September – Thomas Edward Lloyd, politician, 89
22 October – David Rogers, politician in Canada, 79
9 November – Montague Guest, politician, son of Lady Charlotte Guest, 70
10 November – George Essex Evans, Welsh-Australian poet, 46 (complications arising from gall bladder surgery)
11 December – Ludwig Mond, industrialist, 70
13 December – Sir Alfred Lewis Jones, shipping magnate, 64

References 

 
Wales